Püspökladány is a district in south-western part of Hajdú-Bihar County. Püspökladány is also the name of the town where the district seat is found. The district is located in the Northern Great Plain Statistical Region. This district is a part of Hajdúság historical and geographical region.

Geography 
Püspökladány District borders with Hajdúszoboszló District to the north, Derecske District and Berettyóújfalu District to the east, Szeghalom District (Békés County) to the south, Karcag District (Jász-Nagykun-Szolnok County) to the west. The number of the inhabited places in Püspökladány District is 12.

Municipalities 
The district has 2 towns, 3 large villages and 7 villages.
(ordered by population, as of 1 January 2012)

The bolded municipalities are cities, italics municipalities are large villages.

Demographics

In 2011, it had a population of 40,426 and the population density was 55/km².

Ethnicity
Besides the Hungarian majority, the main minority is the Roma (approx. 2,500).

Total population (2011 census): 40,426
Ethnic groups (2011 census): Identified themselves: 37,778 persons:
Hungarians: 35,227 (93.25%)
Gypsies: 2,253 (5.96%)
Others and indefinable: 298 (0.79%)
Approx. 3,000 persons in Püspökladány District did not declare their ethnic group at the 2011 census.

Religion
Religious adherence in the county according to 2011 census:

Reformed – 16,521;
Catholic – 2,833 (Roman Catholic – 2,689; Greek Catholic – 142);
other religions – 345; 
Non-religious – 11,462; 
Atheism – 227;
Undeclared – 9,038.

Gallery

See also
List of cities and towns of Hungary

References

External links
 Postal codes of the Püspökladány District

Districts in Hajdú-Bihar County